Just Jazz, is an album by saxophonist Buddy Tate and trombonist Al Grey, which was recorded in 1984 and released by the Uptown label. The album was reissued on CD with two alternate takes by Reservoir in 1989.

Reception

On AllMusic Scott Yanow states, "Tenor-saxophonist Buddy Tate (who also contributes a bit of clarinet) blends in perfectly with trombonist Al Grey on this swinging quintet session ... Both Tate and Grey were in their late prime at the time".

Track listing
 "Just Jazz" (Al Grey) – 5:05
 "Blues in My Heart" (Benny Carter, Irving Mills) – 6:19
 "Straighten Up and Fly Right" (Nat King Cole, Mills) – 6:28
 "Topsy" (Edgar Battle, Eddie Durham) – 6:46
 "Blue Creek" (Buddy Tate) – 6:02
 "Tangerine" (Victor Schertzinger, Johnny Mercer) – 6:21	
 "Straighten Up and Fly Right" [alternate take] (Cole, Mills) – 5:15 Additional track on CD reissue
 "Just Jazz" [alternate take] (Grey) – 5:14 Additional track on CD reissue

Personnel
Buddy Tate – tenor saxophone, clarinet 
Al Grey – trombone
Richard Wyands – piano
Major Holley – double bass
Al Harewood – drums
Don Sickler - arranger

References

Buddy Tate albums
Al Grey albums
1984 albums
Uptown Records (jazz) albums
Reservoir Records albums
Albums recorded at Van Gelder Studio